Barygenys parvula is a species of frog in the family Microhylidae. It is endemic to New Guinea and is only known from the Adelbert Mountains, an isolated coastal range on the north coast of Papua New Guinea. The specific name parvula is from
the Latin adjective meaning small, in reference to the small size of this frog.

Description
The body is robust, with broad head, truncate shout, relatively short legs, and small eyes. The tympanum is inconspicuous. The fingers are short and unwebbed; the toes are unwebbed and have slightly expanded digital disks. The skin is somewhat warty. The dorsum is brown with indistinct markings. The ventral surfaces are finely mottled in dark and light brown.

The male advertisement call has been described as "a series of rapid, high-pitched peeps".

Habitat and conservation
It is a ground-dwelling species. It appears to adaptable and be able to survive in secondary and degraded habitats. It seems be common at the type locality. It is not considered to be significantly threatened by habitat loss, despite human settlement and forest loss, because of its adaptability.

References

parvula
Amphibians of New Guinea
Amphibians of Papua New Guinea
Endemic fauna of New Guinea
Endemic fauna of Papua New Guinea
Amphibians described in 1981
Taxa named by Richard G. Zweifel
Taxonomy articles created by Polbot